Zimbabwe started competing in the African Games since the 1987 All-Africa Games. Its athletes have won a total of 116 medals.

See also 
 Zimbabwe at the Olympics
 Zimbabwe at the Paralympics
 Sports in Zimbabwe
Below is a table representing all medals across the Games in which it has competed.

References

External links 
 All-Africa Games index - todor66.com